Alper Uludağ (born 11 December 1990) is a Turkish professional footballer who plays as a left back for Giresunspor. He has been capped by the Turkey U-15 and U-21 squads.

References

External links
 
 
 
 

1991 births
Living people
People from Heusden-Zolder
Turkish footballers
Turkey under-21 international footballers
Belgian footballers
Belgian people of Turkish descent
PSV Eindhoven players
Alemannia Aachen players
FC Ingolstadt 04 players
Kayserispor footballers
Trabzonspor footballers
Akhisarspor footballers
Gençlerbirliği S.K. footballers
Konyaspor footballers
Adana Demirspor footballers
Giresunspor footballers
2. Bundesliga players
Turkey youth international footballers
Süper Lig players
TFF First League players
Association football midfielders
Association football defenders
Footballers from Limburg (Belgium)